Subterenochiton is a genus of chitons, marine polyplacophoran molluscs, in the family Ischnochitonidae.

Species
 Subterenochiton gabrieli

References

Chiton genera